"Undetected" is Tesla Boy's tenth Russian single, released on 20 August 2013. It is the fourth single for the album The Universe Made of Darkness.

Music video

Tesla Boy shares the animated video for “Undetected” off their second album The Universe Made of Darkness. Directed by UK-based animator Noriko Okaku, the video premieres today on Jay-Z’s Life + Times and shows the inner illustrated workings of Tesla Boy’s mind.

Interview Noriko Okaku Russian magazine "Afisha":

Track listing

4": Gorby Reagan Rec. / (World) 
 "Undetected" - 4:42
 "Undetected" (Shur-I-Kan Remix) - 5:39
 "Undetected" (Lipelis Remix) - 8:56
 "Undetected" (Pioneerball Remix) - 4:56

References

External links

2013 singles
Tesla Boy songs
2013 songs